Culloden Moor railway station served the village of Culloden, Highland, Scotland from 1898 to 1965 on the Inverness and Aviemore Direct Railway.

History 
The station opened on 1 November 1898 by the Highland Railway. It closed to both passengers and goods traffic on 3 May 1965.

References

External links 

Disused railway stations in Highland (council area)
Railway stations in Great Britain opened in 1898
Railway stations in Great Britain closed in 1965
Beeching closures in Scotland
1898 establishments in Scotland
1965 disestablishments in Scotland
Former Highland Railway stations